Opdyke West (pronounced "Oh-Pee-Dyke") is a town in Hockley County, Texas, United States. The population was 174 at the 2010 census. It takes its name from the nearby community of Opdyke, founded 1925, which was named either for Charles W. Opdyke, railroad director, or for the family of W. A. Dykes, who established the first gin in the area by 1937. Opdyke West was incorporated in 1984.

Geography

Opdyke West is located in central Hockley County at  (33.593241, –102.298924). Texas State Highway 114 passes through the north side of the town, leading west  to Levelland, the county seat, and east  to Lubbock.

Demographics

As of the census of 2000, there were 188 people, 74 households, and 46 families residing in the town. The population density was 791.9 people per square mile (302.4/km2). There were 80 housing units at an average density of 337.0 per square mile (128.7/km2). The racial makeup of the town was 75.53% White, 3.72% Native American, 14.89% from other races, and 5.85% from two or more races. Hispanic or Latino people of any race were 32.98% of the population.

There were 74 households, out of which 44.6% had children under the age of 18 living with them, 48.6% were married couples living together, 13.5% had a female householder with no husband present, and 36.5% were non-families. 23.0% of all households were made up of individuals, and 2.7% had someone living alone who was 65 years of age or older. The average household size was 2.54 and the average family size was 3.11.

In the town, the population was spread out, with 27.7% under the age of 18, 26.1% from 18 to 24, 30.3% from 25 to 44, 13.8% from 45 to 64, and 2.1% who were 65 years of age or older. The median age was 24 years. For every 100 females, there were 106.6 males. For every 100 females age 18 and over, there were 115.9 males.

The median income for a household in the town was $31,667, and the median income for a family was $30,750. Males had a median income of $23,750 versus $17,083 for females. The per capita income for the town was $15,261. About 13.2% of families and 13.6% of the population were below the poverty line, including 22.4% of those under the age of eighteen and none of those 65 or over.

Education
The Town of Opdyke West is served by the Levelland Independent School District.

References

Towns in Hockley County, Texas
Towns in Texas